The Bund or Waitan (Shanghainese romanization: Nga3thae1) is a waterfront area and a protected historical district in central Shanghai. The area centers on a section of Zhongshan Road (East Zhongshan Road No.1) within the former Shanghai International Settlement, which runs along the western bank of the Huangpu River in the eastern part of Huangpu District. The area along the river faces the modern skyscrapers of Lujiazui in the Pudong District. The Bund usually refers to the buildings and wharves on this section of the road, as well as some adjacent areas. From the 1860s to the 1930s, it was the rich and powerful center of the foreign establishment in Shanghai, operating as a legally protected treaty port.

Name
The term "bund" was borrowed into English from Hindi and originally referred to a dyke or embankment. Within the Chinese treaty ports, it was applied specifically to an embanked quay which ran along the shore. The Chinese name for the Bund is unrelated in origin: it literally means "outer bank", and distinguishes this part of the riverfront from the "inner bank" adjacent to the old city of Shanghai.

History

The Shanghai Bund has dozens of historical buildings, lining the Huangpu River, that once housed numerous banks and trading houses from the United Kingdom, France, the United States, Italy, Russia, Germany, Japan, the Netherlands, and Belgium, as well as the consulates of Russia and Britain, a newspaper, the Shanghai Club and the Masonic Club. The Bund lies north of the old, walled city of Shanghai. It was initially a British settlement; later the British and American settlements were combined in the International Settlement. Magnificent commercial buildings in the Beaux Arts style sprang up in the years around the turn of the 20th century as the Bund developed into a major financial center of east Asia. Directly to the south, and just northeast of the old walled city, the former French Bund (the quai de France, part of the Shanghai French Concession) was of comparable size to the Bund but functioned more as a working harbourside.

By the 1940s, the Bund housed the headquarters of many, if not most, of the major financial institutions operating in China, including the "big four" national banks in the Republic of China era. However, with the Communist victory in the Chinese civil war, many of the financial institutions were moved out gradually in the 1950s, and the hotels and clubs closed or converted to other uses. The statues of colonial figures and foreign worthies which had dotted the riverside were also removed.

Post Cultural Revolution
In the late 1970s and early 1980s, with the thawing of economic policy in the People's Republic of China, buildings on the Bund were gradually returned to their former uses. Government institutions were moved out in favour of financial institutions, while hotels resumed trading as such. Also during this period, a series of floods caused by typhoons motivated the municipal government to construct a tall levee along the riverfront, with the result that the embankment now stands some 10 metres higher than street level.  In the 1990s, Zhongshan Road (named after Sun Yat-sen), the road on which the Bund is centred, was widened to ten lanes. As a result, most of the parkland which had existed along the road disappeared. Also in this period, the ferry wharves connecting the Bund and Pudong, which had served the area's original purpose, were removed. A number of pleasure cruises still operate from some nearby wharves.

In the 1990s, the Shanghai government attempted to promote an extended concept of the Bund to boost tourism, and land value in nearby areas, as well as to reconcile the promotion of "colonial relics" with the Socialist ideology. In its expanded form, the term "Bund" (as "New Bund" or "Northern Bund") was used to refer to areas south of the Yan'an Road, and a stretch of riverfront north of the Suzhou River (Zhabei). Such use of the term, however, remains rare outside of tourism literature.

On March 28, 2010, the eve of the opening of the World Expo, the Bund fully completed its renovation project.

Twenty first century redevelopment

From 2008, a major reconfiguration of traffic flow along the Bund was carried out. The first stage of the plan involved the southern end of the Bund, and saw the demolition of a section of the Yan'an Road elevated expressway, including removal of the large elevated expressway exit structure that formerly dominated the confluence of Yan'an Road and the Bund. A second phase involved the year-long restoration of the century-old Waibaidu Bridge at the northern end of the Bund. In a third stage, the former 10-lane Bund roadway was reconstructed in two levels, with six lanes carried in a new tunnel. The vacated road space was used to widen the landscaped promenade along the waterfront. The new concrete bridge that was built in 1991 to relieve traffic on Waibaidu Bridge was rendered obsolete by the new double-levelled roadway, and demolished.

The Bund was reopened to the public on Sunday 28 March 2010 after restoration for the 2010 Expo.

A stampede occurred on December 31, 2014, at 11:36 p.m. in the waterfront. At least 36 people were killed and 47 injured in the incident. The primary incident took place near Chen Yi Square, where a large crowd, estimated at around 300,000, had gathered for the new year celebration.

The bund is one of the most prominent features when viewed from the Shanghai World Financial Center in Pudong and its observation deck on the 100th floor.

Layout

The Bund stretches one mile (1.6 km) along the bank of the Huangpu River. Traditionally, the Bund begins at Yan'an Road (formerly Edward VII Avenue) in the south and ends at Waibaidu Bridge (formerly Garden Bridge) in the north, which crosses Suzhou Creek.

The Bund centres on a stretch of the Zhongshan Road, named after Sun Yat-sen. Zhongshan Road is a largely circular road which formed the traditional conceptual boundary of Shanghai city "proper". To the west of this stretch of the road stands some 52 buildings of various Western classical and modern styles which is the main feature of the Bund (see Architecture and buildings below). To the east of the road was formerly a stretch of parkland culminating at Huangpu Park. (This park is the site of the infamous sign reported to have proclaimed "no dogs or Chinese", although this exact wording never existed. Further information, including an image of the sign, can be found at the article on Huangpu Park.) This area is now much reduced due to the expansion of Zhongshan Road. Further east is a tall levee, constructed in the 1990s to ward off flood waters. The construction of this high wall has dramatically changed the appearance of the Bund.

Near the Nanjing Road intersection stands the only bronze statue along the Bund, a statue of military officer Chen Yi, who served as the first Communist mayor of Shanghai. At the northern end of The Bund, along the riverfront, is Huangpu Park, in which is situated the Monument to the People's Heroes - a tall, abstract concrete tower constructed by the Shanghai government in 1993 to serve as a memorial commemorating Chinese revolutionary martyrs, as well as those who have lost their lives fighting natural disasters in China.

Architecture and buildings

The Bund houses 52 buildings of various architectural styles, generally Eclecticist, but with some buildings displaying predominantly Romanesque Revival, Gothic Revival, Renaissance Revival, Baroque Revival, Neo-Classical or Beaux-Arts styles, and a number in Art Deco style (Shanghai has one of the richest collections of Art Deco architectures in the world). From the south, the main buildings are:
 American Club 209 Fuzhou Rd - General Claire Chennault, then Executive Director of China Post 1,  used the premises until 1948. Built by László Hudec of Curry & Co. between 1923 and 1925 in the American Georgian Style. Originally built as an all-male club after purchasing the site in 1922, it was a popular club for expatriates. A six-story building plus basement, around 1000m2 per floor, designed in the common steel and concrete construction prevalent along The Bund area of Shanghai. Containing bars, billiard room and 50 bedrooms there was also a rooftop garden.  
Asia Building (No. 1, The Bund), originally the McBain Building, housed the Shanghai offices of Royal Dutch Shell and Asiatic Petroleum Company.
 Shanghai Club (No. 2, The Bund), which was the principal social club for British nationals in Shanghai. Since 2010 the Waldorf-Astoria Shanghai Hotel.
 Union Building (No. 3, The Bund), previously housed a number of insurance companies, and is now a shopping centre.
 The Mercantile Bank of India, London, and China building (No. 4, The Bund), housed the Mercantile Bank of India, London and China, built between 1916-1918.
 Nissin Building (No. 5, The Bund), housed a Japanese shipping company.
 China Merchants Bank Building (No. 6, The Bund), housed the first Chinese-owned bank in China, and is now Shiatzy Chen’s Shanghai flagship store, which opened in October 2005.
 Great Northern Telegraph Building (No. 7, The Bund), housed Great Northern Telegraph Company. Site of the first telephone switch in Shanghai in 1882.
 Russel & Co. Building (No. 9, The Bund), housed the China Shipping Merchant Company, and currently houses the Shanghai flagship store for Dolce & Gabbana.
 The HSBC Building (No. 12, The Bund), now used by the Shanghai Pudong Development Bank, was once the Shanghai headquarters of the Hongkong and Shanghai Banking Corporation, which failed to reach a deal with the Shanghai government to buy the building again in the 1990s, when the Shanghai government moved out of the building that they had used since the 1950s. The present building was completed in 1923. At the time, it was called "the most luxurious building between the Suez Canal and the Bering Strait". Its famous ceiling mosaics have been fully restored, and can be viewed inside the entrance hall.
 The Customs House (No. 13, The Bund), was built in 1927 on the site of an earlier, traditional Chinese-style customs house. The clock and bell was built in England and in imitation of Big Ben.
 China Bank of Communications Building (No. 14, The Bund), was the last building to be built on the Bund before the founding of the People's Republic. It now houses the Shanghai Council of Trade Unions.
 Russo-Chinese Bank Building (No. 15, The Bund) is now the Shanghai Gold Exchange.
 Bank of Taiwan Building (No. 16, The Bund) is now the China Merchants Bank.
 North China Daily News Building (No. 17, The Bund) housed the most influential English-language newspaper in Shanghai at the time. Today it houses AIA Insurance.
 Chartered Bank Building (No. 18, The Bund) housed the Shanghai headquarters of what became Standard Chartered Bank the building now houses designer shops, the restaurant Mr & Mrs Bund, and a creative exhibition space. HQ of Chipolbrok Chinese-Polish shipping company (1962-1998).
 Palace Hotel (No. 19, The Bund), today forms part of the Peace Hotel.
 Sassoon House (No. 20, The Bund), with the attached Cathay Hotel, was built by Sir Victor Sassoon. It was, and still is today, famous for its jazz band in its cafe. The top floor originally housed Sassoon's private apartment. Today, it forms the other part of the Peace Hotel.
 Bank of China Building (No. 23, The Bund) housed the headquarters of the Bank of China. The stunted appearance of the building is attributed to Sassoon's insistence that no other building on the Bund could rise higher than his.
 Yokohama Specie Bank Building (No. 24, The Bund) housed the Japanese Yokohama Specie Bank.
 Yangtze Insurance Building (No. 26, The Bund) today houses a Shanghai branch of the Agricultural Bank of China.
 Jardine Matheson Building (No. 27, The Bund) housed the then-powerful Jardine Matheson company. Today it houses a Rolex store on the ground floor, offices, and the House of Roosevelt, a bar and restaurant.
 Glen Line Building (No. 2 Beijing Road) today houses the Shanghai Broadcasting Board.
 Banque de l'Indochine Building (No. 29, The Bund) housed the French bank, Banque de l'Indochine.
 Consulate-General of the United Kingdom (No. 33, The Bund) housed the Consulate-General of the United Kingdom. The building has been renovated and in 2010 re-opened as No. 1 Waitanyuan, a private dining facility for government. Part of the site has also been used to build the Peninsula Hotel, Shanghai which opened in 2010.
 Gutzlaff Signal Tower also known as the Bund Weather Tower, originally provided weather information to ships on the Huangpu River with the current structure dating from 1907.
West Bund Art & Design (Chinese: 西岸艺术与设计博览会) hosts an annual international contemporary art fair held Shanghai, China during November.

Transport

While Shanghai Metro Line 2 crosses the Bund, there are no plans to build a station on the Bund. The closest station is East Nanjing Road, about a five-minute walk up Nanjing Road. East-1 Zhongshan Road is a major bus route.

There were previously frequent ferry services operating by Shanghai Ferry from wharves on and near the Bund. The most popular remaining ferry service runs from Jinling Road wharf, near the southern end of the Bund, to Dongchang Road wharf, at the southern end of Lujiazui across the river. A full fare ride on the ferry costs 2 RMB. 

A number of companies offer Huangpu River cruises (boat tours) departing from the wharf; all of the major buildings in the Bund, and in Pudong, are illuminated each evening.

A pedestrian transit tunnel crosses the Huangpu River from the Bund. Passengers board slow-moving SK people movers which travel along the tunnel, with light effects projected onto the walls of the tunnel. These effects are marketed as a tourist attraction; the charge for the tunnel is ten times the fee for crossing the river on Line 2 and 20 times the 2 RMB fee for crossing by ferry.

In popular culture
There are numerous studies in Chinese and English, and many popular representations.

The Bund was featured in the 1984 novel Empire of the Sun by British author J. G. Ballard, based on his experiences as a boy during the Japanese invasion and occupation. The book was made into a film by Steven Spielberg.

The opening pages of the 1999 novel Cryptonomicon by Neal Stephenson are set on the Bund in November 1941, as civil order collapses under the threat of Japanese invasion.

The Bund is a setting (and namesake) of the Hong Kong television series The Bund (1980) and film Shanghai Grand (1996). The story of both involve pre-World War II era gangsters competing for control of the Bund.

"The Bund" is a song composed by electronic music group The Shanghai Restoration Project released on the group's first eponymous release, inspired by the Shanghai jazz bands of the 1930s. An instrumental version of the song titled "The Bund (Instrumental)" was released in 2008 on the group's Day - Night (Instrumentals) album.

The Bund was featured in the premiere of The Amazing Race 21, the finale of The Amazing Race: China Rush 1, and the premiere of The Amazing Race: China Rush 3.

The Bund is one of the playable stages in The King of Fighters XIV.

Gallery

References

Further reading
 Bickers, Robert, and Isabella Jackson, eds. Treaty Ports in Modern China: Law, Land and Power (Routledge, 2016).
 Hibbard, Peter The Bund Shanghai: China Faces West (Odyssey Illustrated Guides, 2007)
 Johnstone, William C. "The status of foreign concessions and settlements in the Treaty Ports of China." American Political Science Review 31.5 (1937): 942-948. Online
 Nield, Robert.  China’s Foreign Places: The Foreign Presence in China in the Treaty Ports (2015) Online 
 Tai, En-Sai. Treaty ports in China:(a study in diplomacy) (Columbia University, 1918)  Online.
 Taylor, Jeremy E.  "The bund: littoral space of empire in the treaty ports of East Asia." Social History 27.2 (2002): 125-142.
 Wright, Arnold. Twentieth century impressions of Hongkong, Shanghai, and other treaty ports of China: their history, people, commerce, industries, and resources (1908) online
 Zinda, Yvonne Schulz  "Representation and Nostalgic Re-invention of Shanghai in Chinese film." in Port Cities in Asia and Europe (2008): 159+.

Primary sources
 Dennys, Nicholas Belfield. The Treaty Ports of China and Japan. A Complete Guide to the Open Ports of Those Countries, Together with Peking, Yedo, Hongkong and Macao. Forming a Guide Book & Vade Mecum... With 29 Maps and Plans (1867).

External links

 Detailed list of buildings along the Bund
 Key to Buildings with history
 What year the buildings were built on the Bund
 Historic film footage of buildings along The Bund in year 1928 (begins at 0:40 in linked video clip).
 Video of a walk along the Bund Promenade
 A gallery of images featuring kite enthusiasts flying kites in the early morning along the Bund in Shanghai

 
Art Deco
Major National Historical and Cultural Sites in Shanghai
Landmarks in Shanghai
Streets in Shanghai
Waterfronts
Shanghai International Settlement